An anti-café (sometimes called a pay-per-minute café or a time club) is a venue that offers working space, food and drink, where customers pay only for the time they spend there. Anti-cafés became popular around 2011 in Russia and some CIS countries, with further independent anti-cafés opening across the world. Anti-cafés include the Ziferblat chain, founded by Russian writer Ivan Mitin in December 2010 in Moscow, the "Slow Time" café in Wiesbaden opened in 2013, and "Dialogues" in Bangalore.

Anti-cafés mostly target entrepreneurs, digital nomads, students, and creatives who need a cheap and convenient place to get their work done and meet other professionals. They can also be used by companies as a place to give presentations and press conferences at low cost.

Operation

Customers at an anti-café do not pay directly for what they drink and eat, but for the time they spend there, typically charged by the minute. They may help themselves to coffee, tea, snacks, and sweets. As well as food and drink, anti-cafés may offer board games, libraries of books, coworking facilities, Wi-Fi, films, and video game consoles. Services vary according to spaces, with some offering lunch or brunch meals.

Although all anti-cafés charge for time, pricing strategies vary. L'Anticafé in Paris charges by the hour, but customers can also pay a cheaper whole-day rate. Others such as Be'kech in Berlin have the option to pay by the minute. An anti-café in Bordeaux uses a hybrid model of charging a fixed fee for the first hour and by the minute beyond that.

See also 
 Tea room
 Internet café

References

External links 

 The Anti-Café Where Time Is Money
 You Pay for Time, Not Coffee, at This 'Anti-Cafe'
 Anti-Café: Russian Café Concept Idea That Is Taking The World By Storm
 Berlin's First Anti-Café Opens Its Doors

Internet culture
Coffeehouses and cafés in Russia
Russian inventions